The 12655 / 12656 Navjeevan Express is a Superfast Express train belonging to Southern Railways that runs between  and . It is currently being operated with 12655/12656 train numbers on a daily basis. From November 2, 2019, it runs with  highly refurbished LHB coach.

It operates as train number 12655 from Ahmedabad Junction to Chennai Central and as train number 12656 in the reverse direction, serving the states of Gujarat, Maharashtra, Telangana, Andhra Pradesh and Tamil Nadu.

History 

Originally numbered as 145/146, it departed Madras Beach at 06:00 on Tuesdays and arrived Ahmedabad Junction the next day at 17:30. On its return lap, it departed Ahmedabad Junction on Thursdays at 06:50, and reached Madras Beach the next evening at 19:50.

The train ran via Renigunta––Daund––Jalgaon with a 24 coach haul, and a single WDM-2 diesel loco. A single coach AC 2 Sleeper accommodation was introduced in 1984.

Route and halts

Service

The 12655/Ahmedabad–Chennai Central Navjeevan Express has an average speed of 58 km/hr and covers 1891 km in 31h 25m.
The 12656/Chennai Central–Ahmedabad Navjeevan Express has an average speed of 57 km/hr and covers 1891 km in 31h 50m.

Coach composition and position 

The train has highly refurbished LHB coach with max speed of 110 kmph. The train consists of 22 coaches. Coach position, when the train leaves from Chennai Central bound for Ahmedabad Junction.

 1 AC First cum AC Two Tier
 1 AC II Tier
 5 AC III Tier
 1 Pantry car
 10 Sleeper coaches
 2 General Unreserved
 2 End-on Generator cars (EOG)

Schedule

Traction

This Train Hauls Royapuram Loco Shed WAP 7 HOG From Chennai Central To Ahmedabad

References

External links 
 Navjeevan Express (12655) Time-Table
 Navjeevan Express (12656) Time-Table
 Navjivan Express Time-Table India Rail Info

Transport in Chennai
Express trains in India
Railway services introduced in 1978
Rail transport in Gujarat
Rail transport in Tamil Nadu
1978 establishments in India
Transport in Ahmedabad
Named passenger trains of India